Norfleet may refer to:

People with the family name
Bobby Norfleet (born 1958), American race car driver
Celeste O. Norfleet, American author
Dennis Norfleet (born 1993), American football player
Earl Norfleet Phillips, American diplomat
Julian Norfleet (born 1991), American basketball player
Tia Norfleet (born 1986), American race car driver
Bill Norfleet (born 1971), resource conservationist

Location
Norfleet, Kentucky, a community in the United States
Norfleet House, historic house in Suffolk, Virginia, location of the 1863 American Civil War Battle of Suffolk
Norfleet, trio camp, a music camp